Bronson Avenue (Ottawa Road #79) is a major north-south arterial road in Ottawa, Ontario, Canada. It starts as a continuation of the Airport Parkway, which is an expressway to the Macdonald-Cartier International Airport. It continues past Carleton University, the Glebe, north through Centretown, and ends downtown at Sparks Street.

Upon reaching Albert Street, Bronson ends as a local road for downtown residents.

Bronson Avenue is a gateway to the southern neighbourhoods of Ottawa and since it is generally faster to take Bronson Avenue than Bank Street, the street is usually quite busy, particularly at rush hour.

Glebe Collegiate Institute and Carleton University border on Bronson Avenue.

There has been considerable debate about the nature of the road in the past few years; some have called for an expressway to be built in the corridor to link to a twinned Airport Parkway; but that has been extremely unpopular with local residents calling for improved public transit and is unlikely to be built.

Bronson Avenue took its name from Ottawa businessman and politician (Ontario MLA) Erskine Henry Bronson.

Neighbourhoods
Bronson Avenue is considered a boundary line for several Ottawa neighbourhoods:
Centretown
Centretown West
The Glebe
Old Ottawa South

Major intersections
Major intersections (from south to north):
Start as a continuation of Airport Parkway - 0.0 km
Sunnyside Avenue - 0.9 km
Colonel By Drive - 1.3 km
Carling Avenue - 2.2 km
Highway 417  - 2.6 km
Catherine Street - 2.7 km
Gladstone Avenue - 3.0 km
Somerset Street - 3.4 km
Slater Street - 3.9 km
Albert Street - 4.0 km
Ends at Sparks Street - 4.1 km

Points of interest
Bronson Centre
Carleton University

External links

 Google Maps: Bronson Avenue

Notes

Roads in Ottawa